Stan Espie is a former Irish international lawn and indoor bowler.

Espie won the gold medal in the triples event with teammates Sammy Allen and Jim Baker at the 1984 World Outdoor Bowls Championship in Aberdeen.

He also represented Northern Ireland in the 1978 Commonwealth Games and 1984 World Outdoor Bowls Championship. He was an insurance agent by trade and has won the Irish National championships indoors and outdoors.

References

Irish male lawn bowls players
Male lawn bowls players from Northern Ireland
Living people
Sportspeople from Belfast
Bowls players at the 1978 Commonwealth Games
Bowls players at the 1986 Commonwealth Games
Commonwealth Games competitors for Northern Ireland
Bowls World Champions
Year of birth missing (living people)